Jaroslav Eminger (4 June 1886 – 14 July 1964) was a Czech military officer who commanded the Government Army during the period of the Protectorate of Bohemia and Moravia.

Military career
Eminger was educated at the Theresian Military Academy and served in the Austro-Hungarian Army on the Russian and Italian fronts in World War I. Between 1919 and 1922 he led the new Czechoslovak military mission in Budapest, coordinating its intelligence-gathering activities. Returning to Czechoslovakia, he advanced through the ranks as a cavalry officer, ultimately coming to command the 3rd Fast Division. Eminger left the country following the German occupation of the Czech lands in 1939 but was persuaded by Alois Eliáš to return to help lead the creation of the new Government Army, of which he became the first commander in August. As inspector-general of the Government Army, Eminger was made General 2nd Class on 11 November 1939 and promoted to General 1st Class on 1 August 1942.

During his time leading the Government Army, Eminger pursued a program of outward cooperation with the German authorities while quietly working to ensure the army's operational incompetence and turning a blind eye to resistance activities on the part of soldiers. In 1943 the Government Army was deployed in an attempt to capture parachutist drop sites in Bohemia and Moravia used by resistance fighters and the Allies. According to one account, when asked by a subordinate officer what Protectorate soldiers should do in the event they successfully intercepted parachutists, Eminger replied, "if there are few you will ignore them, if there are many you will join them".

In the spring of 1944, Ferdinand Schaal requested Emil Hácha order the deployment of the Government Army to Italy to assist German military operations there, a deployment Eminger protested in vain. One of Eminger's final acts as commander of the Government Army came on 5 May 1945, when he ordered the army's 1st Battalion to turn their weapons against the Wehrmacht in the Battle of Czechoslovak Radio.

Arrest and exoneration
Eminger was arrested after the end of World War II and, in April 1947, went on trial on charges of collaboration with Germany. He was acquitted of all charges, with the court recording the verdict that Eminger was "a loyal Czech and a brave man". He lived the rest of his life in secluded retirement.

See also
 Josef Ježek

References

1886 births
1964 deaths
Austro-Hungarian military personnel of World War I
Czech military leaders
Czechoslovak military personnel of World War II
People from Čáslav
People from the Kingdom of Bohemia
Protectorate of Bohemia and Moravia
Theresian Military Academy alumni